Notre Dame de Lourdes (or Notre-Dame-de-Lourdes) is French for "Our Lady of Lourdes", which refers to the Marian apparition that is reported to have appeared before various individuals in separate occasions around Lourdes, France.

It may also refer to:

Places

Canada
 Notre-Dame-de-Lourdes, Manitoba
 Notre-Dame-de-Lourdes, New Brunswick
 Notre-Dame-de-Lourdes, Centre-du-Québec, Quebec
 Notre-Dame-de-Lourdes, Lanaudière, Quebec
 Notre-Dame-de-Lourdes-de-Lorrainville, a community in Lorrainville, Quebec

Institutions
 Hospitalité Notre Dame de Lourdes, a Roman Catholic religious confraternity
 Collège Notre-Dame-de-Lourdes, an education facility located in Longueuil, Quebec, Canada

See also
 Notre Dame (disambiguation)
 Nossa Senhora de Lourdes (disambiguation)